Benjamín Vencar Paredes Martínez (born August 7, 1961 in Ecatepec de Morelos, Estado de México) is a Mexican former long-distance runner who specialized in the marathon, but who also competed in duathlons, even winning a silver medal for Mexico at the ITU-world championships in Frankfurt am Main, Germany, in June 1992.

Achievements

Personal bests
10,000 metres - 28:43 minutes (2003) Montreal, Canada
Half marathon - 1:01:49 hours (1999) Half Marathon - World Championships. Oslo, Norway 
Marathon - 2:10:41 hours (1994) Rotterdam , The Netherlands

References

External links

Wrong Turn
photos at flickr.com

1962 births
Living people
Sportspeople from the State of Mexico
People from Ecatepec de Morelos
Mexican male long-distance runners
Athletes (track and field) at the 1996 Summer Olympics
Athletes (track and field) at the 2000 Summer Olympics
Olympic athletes of Mexico
Athletes (track and field) at the 1995 Pan American Games
Athletes (track and field) at the 2003 Pan American Games
Pan American Games medalists in athletics (track and field)
Pan American Games gold medalists for Mexico
Central American and Caribbean Games gold medalists for Mexico
Competitors at the 1993 Central American and Caribbean Games
Central American and Caribbean Games medalists in athletics
Medalists at the 1995 Pan American Games
20th-century Mexican people
21st-century Mexican people